John Steiner (1941–2022) was an English actor.

John Steiner may also refer to:

John Michael Steiner (1925–2014), Czech-American sociologist
John Steiner (psychoanalyst) (born 1934), psychoanalyst

See also
John Steiner Store
John Stein (disambiguation)